Stara Vrhnika is a village north of Vrhnika in the Inner Carniola region of Slovenia. It includes the hamlets of Kuren (or Koren), Podčelo, and Razor.

Name
The name Stara Vrhnika literally means 'old Vrhnika'. Stara Vrhnika was attested in Latin church records as ex superiore Verchnik, and as Alt Oberlaibach oder Gorena Verchnik between 1764 and 1783. The village was originally called Gornja Vrhnika or Zgornja Vrhnika (literally, 'upper Vrhnika') in Slovene, referring to its position about 30 meters above neighboring Vrhnika. With the arrival of the German-speaking Habsburgs, Vrhnika became known as Oberlaibach (literally, 'upper Ljubljana'), which would have made the German designation for Stara Vrhnika the semantically awkward Ober-Oberlaibach. It was therefore called Alt Oberlaibach (literally, 'old upper Ljubljana') in German, and this was the source of the Slovene name Stara Vrhnika.

Church
The local church in Stara Vrhnika is dedicated to Saint Leonard. It was first mentioned in written sources in 1526. A second church on Kuren Hill west of the settlement is dedicated to Saint Nicholas. It has a flat painted wooden ceiling with poorly preserved paintings from the 16th century. Both churches belong to the Parish of Vrhnika.

Notable people
Notable people that were born or lived in Stara Vrhnika include:
Floris Oblak (1924–2006), painter
Fran Ogrin (1880–?), technical writer and journalist
Gustav Ogrin (1900–1962), designer and technical writer
Ivan Ogrin (1875–1946), designer and crafts organizer
Simon Ogrin (1851–1930), painter
Valentin Petkovšek (1888–1975), agricultural specialist and technical writer

References

External links

Stara Vrhnika on Geopedia
Stara Vrhnika Local Community site

Populated places in the Municipality of Vrhnika